Flädle is a southern German garnish and soup ingredient from the region of Swabia consisting of savory pancakes, cut into ribbons.

Flädle are made by first making plain crepe-style pancakes (Palatschinken), then tightly rolling them up and slicing them into ribbons. They are then usually served in a clear soup or beef broth in a dish of Flädlessuppe. In other parts of Germany, the dish is known as Eierkuchensuppe, derived from the regional name Eierkuchen (lit. "egg cakes") for pancakes.

In Austria a similar dish to Flädle is called Frittaten (from the Italian frittata, "frying"). Frittaten are thicker than Flädle.

See also
 List of pancakes

References

External links
 Flädle Recipe

German soups
Swabian cuisine
Pancakes